Ellerbee is a surname derived from the town of Ellerby in the East Riding of Yorkshire, England.

Notable people and fictional characters with this surname include:
 Bobby Ellerbee, voice actor
 Derrell Ellerbee, character in Roman J. Israel, Esq.
 Emmanuel Ellerbee, American footballer
 Garner Ellerbee, character in Baywatch
 Linda Ellerbee, American journalist

See also
 Ellerby (disambiguation)

References